Nartich (also Romanized as Nārtīch; also known as Nartieh, Nārtīj, Nātīj, and Tārtīch) is a village in Kork and Nartich Rural District, in the Central District of Bam County, Kerman Province, Iran. At the 2006 census, its population was 842, in 216 families.

References 

Populated places in Bam County